Pauloff Harbor is an unincorporated community with no year-round population on the west side of Pavlov Harbor on the northern coast of Sanak Island,  southeast of False Pass, in the Aleutians East Borough of the U.S. state of Alaska. The primary means of transportation is boats and float planes from False Pass or King Cove.
While a post office was established in 1949, the village has no permanent population at present or public facilities, although a village corporation operates from a post office box in Sand Point, where most of the corporation shareholders live.

Demographics

Pauloff Harbor first appeared on the 1920 U.S. Census as an unincorporated village as "Panloff Harbor." In 1930, it returned as "Pavlof Harbor." In 1940, it returned simply as "Pavlof." In 1950, it returned again as "Pavlof Harbor" (with the alternative of "Pauloff Harbor"). In 1960–70, it continued to return as "Pavlof Harbor." In 1980, it was classified as an Alaska Native Village Statistical Area (ANVSA) and returned as the present spelling of "Pauloff Harbor." However, it returned no residents. It has not reported separately on any censuses since.

Pauloff Harbor Seaplane Base 

Pauloff Harbor Seaplane Base  is a public-use seaplane base in Pauloff Harbor.

Facilities 
Pauloff Harbor Seaplane Base has one seaplane landing area designated N/S which measures 3,000 by 500 feet (914 x 152 m).

References

External links
 
 

Populated coastal places in Alaska on the Pacific Ocean
Ghost towns in Alaska
Populated places in Aleutians East Borough, Alaska
Road-inaccessible communities of Alaska
Defunct airports in Alaska